Harris School may refer to:

 Harris School of Public Policy Studies at the University of Chicago, Chicago, Illinois, United States
 Harris Church of England Academy, Rugby, Warwickshire, England
 Harris School of Business, United States
 The Harris School (Texas)